Journal of a Residence on a Georgian Plantation in 1838–1839 (the Journal) is an account by Fanny Kemble of the time spent on her husband's plantation in Butler Island, Georgia. The account was not published until 1863, after her marriage had ended and the American Civil War had begun. According to PBS, she decided to publish it then "in response to England's hostility toward the North and Lincoln's Emancipation Proclamation." 

Kemble was already notable in her own right both before and after the publication of the Journal, but it represents her "lasting historical importance."

Background 
 Frances Anne Kemble (1809-1893) was an English stage actress who met and married Pierce Mease Butler, a Philadelphian who was the absentee owner of large rice and cotton plantations on St. Simon's Island and Butler Island, Georgia where hundreds of people were enslaved. 

While living in Philadelphia, Kemble became familiar with the abolitionist teachings of the Quakers and began to question the source of her husband's wealth. He convinced her to visit the plantation with him and believed that would help her see the plantation system sympathetically. The family travelled to the plantation in 1838, and Kemble journaled about the living and working conditions of the enslaved people on the plantation, becoming increasingly abolitionist herself, which resulted in tensions between her and her husband. 

Butler threatened to deny Kemble access to their two daughters if she published anything of her observations about the plantation conditions. The couple divorced in 1849. Butler was awarded custody of their children, and forbid Kemble from seeing them.

Journal 
The Journal documents Kemble's initial experiences of appreciating aspects of plantation life with the exception of "the one small thing of 'the slavery'" and her growing horror with the system. She writes about conversations with enslaved people and her attempts to intercede with her husband on behalf of the people enslaved on his plantations. 

The unpublished account was read widely by abolitionists before the Civil War. Kemble had been reluctant to publish it because of ongoing tensions with her former husband, but when the Civil War started, and Britain supported the Confederacy, she decided to publish to try to change Britain's views of the Confederacy, the war, and the Emancipation Proclamation.

Publication history 
The Journal was first published in England in May 1863 and soon afterward in the United States. It went out of print until 1961, when Alfred A. Knopf published a reprint with a foreword by John A. Scott.

Reviews 
The Journal was reviewed contemporaneously in The New York Times and The Atlantic; the latter noted:

In 1960, the historian Margaret Davis Cate published a "scathing critique" sympathetic to the plantation system and vilified Kemble's description of it in the Georgia Historical Quarterly.

Modern critics note that Kemble was primarily arguing for improved conditions for enslaved people and that her abolitionist views were based on the belief that "moral failings" of slave owners inevitably resulted in mistreatment, rather than an enslaved person's inborn right to freedom, justified abolition.

Impact 
Kemble's Journal changed how Britain viewed the Confederacy and the Emancipation Proclamation and affected feelings in Britain on helping the Confederacy. 

According to Encyclopedia.com Kemble's "lasting historical importance... derives from the private journal she kept during her time in the Sea Islands." According to the University of Georgia Press, which has the book in reprint, it "has long been recognized by historians as unique in the literature of American slavery."

The Journal inspired the one-woman show "Shame the Devil: An Audience with Fanny Kemble" by Ann Ludlum, which was produced in Brunswick, Georgia, in 2016.  The show continues annual performances at Brunswick's Ritz Theater as of 2022.

References

Further reading

External links 
  

Cultural history of the American Civil War
Books about human rights
Origins of the American Civil War
1863 books
Abolitionism in the United States
Slavery in the United States